21st Anniversary: Not That Innocent is the ninth studio album by British heavy metal band, Girlschool, released on Communiqué Records in 2002. The production of the album lasted for a prolonged time and it was finally released when lead guitarist Kelly Johnson and bassist Tracey Lamb had already left the band. They were replaced by new lead guitarist Jackie Chambers and by the original bass player Enid Williams, who play in two new songs included in this album.

Track listing

Credits
Kim McAuliffe – lead vocals on tracks 2, 6, 9, 10, 11, 12, rhythm guitar, backing vocals
Kelly Johnson – lead vocals on tracks 3, 4, 5, 7, 8, 13, lead guitar on tracks 2–11, 13
Jackie Chambers – lead guitar on tracks 1 and 12
Tracey Lamb – bass on tracks 2–11, backing vocals
Enid Williams – lead vocals on track 1, bass on tracks 1 and 12
Denise Dufort – drums
Tim Hamill – bass on track 13, producer and engineer

References

External links
Official Girlschool discography

2002 albums
Girlschool albums